Lincoln High School (shortened to Lincoln High, Lincoln, or L.H.S.) is a public high school in Seattle, Washington, part of the Seattle Public Schools district and named after Abraham Lincoln, the 16th President of the United States.

The school was re-established as a comprehensive high school in the fall of 2019 after being closed in 1981 and comprehensively renovated in 2017-2019. The school re-opened with grades 9-10 but has now reached the full capacity of four grades. During the years when the high school was not operating, the school buildings were used to house public schools "in exile" while their own buildings underwent  major renovations and as the North Seattle site for Cascadia Elementary, a selective public school, which has since relocated.

History 
The school was built in 1906 in the Wallingford neighborhood to handle the growth in the area. It opened in 1907 and until 1971 was a three-year senior high school (grades 10-11-12, or sophomores/juniors/seniors), thereafter a four-year high school with grades 9 to 12. Lincoln High closed as a school in its own right after 74 years in 1981, and the building has been used several times since as a temporary holding location for other Seattle public schools as their own buildings underwent renovations / remodelings / rebuildings. The Lincoln building housed Ballard High School in 1997–1999 while their current facility was being built, then the Latona Elementary School (1999–2000). It next housed Roosevelt High School in 2004–2006 and Garfield High School in 2006–2008 while their respective buildings were being renovated and upgraded. September 2009 to June 2010, Lincoln was the home to the Hamilton International Middle School while the Hamilton building was renovated and housed the recently split APP North middle school cohort for one year with Hamilton in 2009-2010. The old Lincoln High building then underwent its own renovations and became an Attendance Area / zoned neighborhood comprehensive public high school once again in 2019.

Like many Seattle schools, Lincoln was impacted by the Japanese American internment during World War II. Among those interned were the president of the boys' Lynx Club and girls' Triple L and the editor of the school newspaper, the Totem.

After the war, Edison Technical School (later Seattle Central College) on Seattle's Capitol Hill neighborhood expanded and took over the facilities of Broadway High School, mainly to serve returning veterans. Broadway's regular high school student body were all transferred to Lincoln High. For some years after the war, Lincoln also served the city of Shoreline, until that suburb built its own public high school. In 1948, during the national "Red Scare" controversy, the school was receiving letters warning of communists within the teaching staff. In 1949, during a tuberculosis outbreak, Lincoln sent teachers to Firland Sanatorium, and patients earned Lincoln diplomas.

Lincoln High School was closed in 1981 due to declining enrollment. At the time the decision was made to shutter Lincoln, the Totem newspaper had been rated All-American status by the National Scholastic Press Association seven semesters in a row, and it had a notable arts magnet program and an excellent special education program.
 
In the years after its closure, the Lincoln High building was used by various community and religious organizations, including the Wallingford Boys and Girls Club. In 1990, the derelict building was used as the filming location for the dystopian science fiction thriller Class of 1999. A 1993 plan would have renovated Lincoln as a new home for Hamilton Middle School, also setting aside part of the building for community services. Instead, it has become an interim location for various other schools over the next few decades.

Facilities

Lincoln High School comprises five main buildings on a single campus.  The three western buildings (1907/1914-1920/1930), are co-joined and form a cohesive historic presence facing Interlake Avenue North.  The two eastern buildings are stand-alone structures constructed in the late 1950s and opened in 1959.

Between 1914 and 1920, the north wing and several other minor additions were added by Stephen’s architectural successor, Edgar Blair. The 1930 south wing was added by Stephen’s successor, Floyd A. Naramore.

The school’s property for its campus was also enlarged in 1957 to cover 6.72 acres.  Since then the playfield has been replaced by a paved parking area.

A bronze bust of a young Abraham Lincoln, sculpted in 1964 by Avard Fairbanks, stood on the east side of the school until its relocation into a new entryway in 2019.

The 2017-2019 renovation to the historic buildings included relocating the main entry away from the historic entry, restoring the historic library, creating a new two-story central commons space, and upgrading the structure, mechanical and electrical systems, and providing new energy-efficient windows and exterior walls.

Notable alumni
 Kay Bell, American football player in the National Football League (NFL) with the Detroit Lions, Chicago Bears and New York Giants in the 1930s and a professional wrestler.
 Eddie Carlson, chair of the World's Fair Commission, for Seattle's Century 21 Exposition in 1962 and later president and chief executive officer of United Airlines and its later holding company U.A.L, Inc.
 Don Coryell (1943), Professional football coach in the National Football League (NFL) with the St. Louis Cardinals (NFL), and San Diego Chargers
Anita White, American blues singer and activist
 Rick "The Peanut Man" Kaminski (1944-2011), beloved Safeco Field sports stadium food hawker.
 John Franklin Koenig, artist.
 Phyllis Lamphere, former president of Seattle City Council and first woman president of the National League of Cities
 Betty MacDonald, author of The Egg and I.
 Helene Madison, three-time 1932 Olympics gold-medal winner in swimming, graduated Class of 1931.
 Dorothy Provine, television and film actress.
 Bernice Stern, first woman elected to the King County Council.
 Ralph Weymouth, Vice Admiral, USN, attended, but moved before graduating.
 Rich Hand, former Major League Baseball pitcher
 Lynn Woolsey, former ten-term California congresswoman.

Further reading

References

External links

 School Website
 Lincoln High School Alumni Association
 History Link – Lincoln High School
 Seattle Then and Now – Wallingford fisticuffs

High schools in King County, Washington
Seattle Public Schools
Educational institutions established in 1906
Educational institutions disestablished in 1981
1906 establishments in Washington (state)
Wallingford, Seattle
1981 disestablishments in Washington (state)
Schools in Seattle